In enzymology, 2-aminomuconate deaminase (also known as amnd) is an enzyme that catalyzes the chemical reaction

2-aminomuconate + H2O  4-oxalocrotonate + NH3

Thus, the two substrates of this enzyme are 2-aminomuconate and H2O, whereas its two products are 4-oxalocrotonate and NH3.

This enzyme belongs to the family of hydrolases, those acting on carbon-nitrogen bonds other than peptide bonds, specifically in compounds that have not been otherwise categorized within EC number 3.5.  The systematic name of this enzyme class is 2-aminomuconate aminohydrolase. This enzyme participates in tryptophan metabolism.

References

 
 

EC 3.5.99
Enzymes of unknown structure